The Jabiru J250 is one model in a large family of two and four seat Australian light aircraft developed as touring aircraft and provided in kit form by Jabiru Aircraft. The aircraft was also assembled and sold in the US by Jabiru USA as a Light Sport Aircraft (LSA).

Design and development
The J250 is constructed from composite materials. The  span high wing is strut-braced. The standard engine is the  Jabiru 3300 six cylinder, horizontally opposed, four stroke aircraft engine. The tricycle landing gear has optional wheel pants. The J250 shares the same fuselage as the four-seat J450 model, the difference being that the rear seats are not installed  on the J250. As a result, the baggage area in the J250 is among the largest in its class.

Variants

data from Jabiru

Jabiru J160

Jabiru J170
US light-sport aircraft two-seat model derived from the J160.
Jabiru J200

Jabiru J230
A two-seater, designed as a US light-sport aircraft, with a large baggage compartment behind the seats.
Jabiru J250

Jabiru J400
Four seat version powered by a  Jabiru 3300 engine and marketed circa 2004.
Jabiru J430
A four seater version of the J230 with two seats in the former baggage compartment.

Jabiru J450

Jabiru SP
Two seat version for the US light-sport aircraft market, powered by a  Jabiru 3300 engine and marketed circa 2004. The SP has a cruise speed of 
Jabiru UL
Two seat version for the European microlight category powered by an  Jabiru 2200 engine and marketed circa 2004. The SP has a cruise speed of

Specifications (J250)

References

External links

 
 Jabiru J430 photos

Single-engined tractor aircraft
High-wing aircraft
2000s Australian civil aircraft
J250